The Church of St Edmund, Chingford, is a Grade II listed Church of England parish church at Larkswood Road, Chingford, in Greater London.

History
St Edmund's Church was originally consecrated in January 1909 by the Bishop of St Albans as a chapel of ease for the parish church of St Peter and St Paul, Chingford, in a building now known as the Ryan Hall in Chingford Mount Road. A church hall was built in 1927.

The present church was built in 1938; the architect was Nugent Cachemaille-Day, who was a leading British exponent of Expressionist architecture. It has a nave of four bays, with two wide aisles, transepts and a short chancel. A low square tower is over the crossing. The style is described as "simplified perpendicular Gothic". The exterior is clad in knapped flint, reflecting the vernacular Essex tradition. A separate ecclesiastical parish was formed for St Edmund's in 1939. It became a Grade II listed building in 1987.

References

Buildings and structures in the London Borough of Waltham Forest
Grade II listed churches in London
Edmund
Nugent Cachemaille-Day buildings
20th-century Anglican church buildings
Churches completed in 1938
Grade II listed buildings in the London Borough of Waltham Forest